Baby Mine is a 1917 American silent comedy film directed by both John S. Robertson and Hugo Ballin and starring Madge Kennedy. The picture marked Kennedy's screen debut and was one of the first films produced by Samuel Goldwyn as an independent after founding his own studio.

The film is based on a 1910 Broadway play Baby Mine by Margaret Mayo. The story was filmed once again as Baby Mine (1928) with Charlotte Greenwood at MGM, the successor to Goldwyn Pictures. This version, however, at one time thought lost, is held in the French archive Cinematheque Francais.

Plot
As described in a film magazine, Alfred (Morgan) catches his wife Zoie (Kennedy) in so many lies that he leaves home and establishes an office in Boston. He is very fond of children so Zoie and Jimmie's wife Aggie (Adams) conspire to tell him that an heir has arrived, with Zoie planning on adopting a baby. Before arrangements have been completed for the baby's adoption, Alfred arrives home, necessitating the stealing of a child from a foundling home. The mother of the baby, however, sets up such a rumpus that they decide to return it and borrow the washerwoman's new-born babe, one of a set of twins. More complications result when Jimmie (Cumberland) comes in with the other twin, followed by the washerwoman's husband demanding his children back. While the three babies are being cooed over by Alfred, who believes he is the father of triplets, the respective parents arrive and claim their children.

Cast

Reception
Like many American films of the time, Baby Mine was subject to cuts by city and state film censorship boards. The Chicago Board of Censors ordered cut a closeup of money.

References

External links

 
 

1917 films
American silent feature films
Films directed by John S. Robertson
Films directed by Hugo Ballin
American films based on plays
Silent American comedy films
1917 comedy films
American black-and-white films
1910s rediscovered films
Rediscovered American films
1910s American films
1910s English-language films